Kristian Konstantinov Kostov (Bulgarian and ; born 15 March 2000) is a Bulgarian-Russian singer. He was a finalist in season one of The Voice Kids Russia and a runner-up in the fourth season of X Factor Bulgaria. He represented Bulgaria in the Eurovision Song Contest 2017 with the song "Beautiful Mess", finishing in second place. In January 2018, Kostov won the EBBA Public Choice award. In January 2019, he was one of seven singers who performed in the seventh season of Singer (previously I Am a Singer).

Personal life

Kostov was born in Moscow to a Kazakh mother and a Bulgarian father. He has an older brother, Daniel, and a younger sister, Sofia. As a child, he learned Bulgarian from his father, English from his brother, and Kazakh from his grandfather.

On 5 May 2019, he witnessed the Aeroflot Flight 1492 accident at Sheremetyevo International Airport, Moscow, Russia.

Career

2014–2016: The Voice Kids Russia & X Factor Bulgaria

Kostov participated in the Russian version of The Voice. He was part of the first season of the kids version of the show where his mentor was Dima Bilan, who chose Kostov to advance to the finals. After his success in Russia, Kristian auditioned for the fourth season of X Factor Bulgaria as he is of Bulgarian origin. He was selected as one of the three male contestants who advanced to the live shows and became one of the finalists. During the finals, he performed the Lyube's song "Позови меня" solo, a duet with Vasil Naydenov for "Сбогом, Моя Любов", and Emil Dimitrov's song "Ако си Дал" as his winning song on the second night. When the final results were revealed, he was runner-up.

2016–2018: Virginia Records, debut single and Eurovision

On 7 October 2016, his debut single "Ne si za men" was released by Virginia Records. The song peaked to number 13 on the Bulgarian Singles Chart. He featured on Pavell and Venci Venc's single "Vdigam Level", which was released on 25 November 2016, and peaked to number 13 on the Bulgarian Singles Chart. On 13 March 2017, it was announced that he would represent Bulgaria in the Eurovision Song Contest 2017 with the song "Beautiful Mess".

2019–present: Singer 
On 11 January 2019, Kostov was revealed as the last of the seven first-round performers competing on the seventh season of China's long-running singing competition, Singer, whose cast consisted of veteran Chinese singers Liu Huan, Chyi Yu, Yang Kun, Wu Tsing-fong, Zhang Xin, and Escape Plan. Kostov was also the youngest contestant in Singers history at 18.

Discography

Extended plays

Singles

As lead artist

As featured artist

Other collaborations

References

External links

Kristian Kostov profile at Virginia Records 

2000 births
Living people
Singers from Moscow
21st-century Bulgarian male singers
X Factor (Bulgarian TV series)
Eurovision Song Contest entrants for Bulgaria
Eurovision Song Contest entrants of 2017
Russian activists against the 2022 Russian invasion of Ukraine
Bulgarian people of Kazakhstani descent
Russian people of Bulgarian descent
Russian people of Kazakhstani descent
The Voice Kids contestants
21st-century Russian male singers
21st-century Russian singers